Xylocoris cursitans is a species of bugs in the family Lyctocoridae. It is found in Europe and Northern Asia (excluding China) and North America.

References

Further reading

External links

 

Lyctocoridae
Articles created by Qbugbot
Insects described in 1807